Archives, Vol. 2 is a 2001 compilation album by Delerium. It was released on Nettwerk Records shortly after being released in the UK. It brings together tracks from four of their previous albums: Spiritual Archives, Spheres, Spheres 2 and Cryogenic Studio.

Track listing

Disc one

Spiritual Archives
<li> "Drama" – 7:36
<li> "Aftermath II" – 7:34
<li> "Ephemeral Passage" – 6:28
<li> "Awakenings" – 8:13

Spheres
<li> "Monolith" – 7:42
<li> "Colony" – 7:21
<li> "Dark Matter" – 7:29
<li> "Cloud Barrier" – 6:38

Disc two

Spheres 2
<li> "Morphology" – 8:50
<li> "Transhumanist" – 10:11
<li> "Shockwave" – 7:04
<li> "Dimensional Space" – 5:26
<li> "Hypoxia" – 8:09
<li> "Otherworld" – 3:49

Cryogenic Studios
<li> "Infra Stellar" – 8:16

References

Delerium albums
2001 compilation albums